Events in the year 1933 in Bolivia.

Incumbents
President: Daniel Salamanca Urey
Vice President: José Luis Tejada Sorzano

Events
January 20–26 - First Battle of Nanawa
February - Battle of Campo Jordán
May - Bolivian legislative election, 1933
July 4–9 - Second Battle of Nanawa
August 30-September 15 - Battle of Campo Grande
November–December - Campo Vía pocket

Births

Deaths

See also
Chaco War

 
1930s in Bolivia
Years of the 20th century in Bolivia